Robert J. Mellow is an American politician from Pennsylvania who served as a Democratic  member of the Pennsylvania State Senate for the 22nd District from 1971 to 2010. He also served as the Minority Floor Leader from 1994 to 2010 and President pro tempore from 1992 to 1994.

In 2012, he pleaded guilty to federal charges of conspiracy to commit mail fraud and filing a false tax return and was sentenced to 16 months in federal prison.

Early life and education
Mellow was born on December 10, 1942 in Peckville, Pennsylvania to James and Alice Mellow.  Mellow served in the National Guard from 1962 to 1968 and, afterwards, attended Lackawanna Junior College and University of Scranton. He earned his BS in accounting from Bethel College.

Career
He was elected to the State Senate in 1970, defeating Republican incumbent Arthur Piasecki, and was the Democratic caucus leader 1989 through 2010. Mellow represented the 22nd district, which included all of Lackawanna County and neighboring portions of Monroe County and Luzerne County.  When the Democrats held the majority in the Senate from 1992 to 1994, Mellow served as the President Pro Tempore.

Mellow is a supporter of efforts to establish a medical school in Scranton.  He successfully appropriated $35 million of the estimated $100 million cost in the state capital budget.

In the 1980s, Mellow was under investigation by the FBI for allegedly taking kickback from Mount Airy Lodge, however charges were never filed.  He was also known to be good friends with the former owner of Mount Airy Lodge, Louis DeNaples, who had suspected ties to the Bufalino crime family.

As president pro tempore, Mellow was the first lawmaker to authorize the use of television cameras on the state Senate floor to broadcast live Senate sessions.<ref>[http://www.thedailyreview.com/site/news.cfm?newsid=17746971&BRD=2276&PAG=461&dept_id=465049&rfi=6 Micaehl Race, Senate Dem leader: Open records law overhaul needed", The Daily and Sunday Review, Towanda, Pennsylvania, 1/25/07] </ref>

Mellow indicated interest in running for the Governor's office in 2010. However, he ultimately did not run for Governor, and announced his intention not to seek re-election to the Senate in 2010. He was succeeded as the Democratic floor leader by Jay Costa.

 2005 Pay Raise 

Mellow was one of the leaders of the ill-fated legislative pay raise in 2005. He told constituent Bill McIntyre to "Get a life" in an email exchange about the pay raise bill. This phrase became a rallying cry for reformers that year.

Federal investigation
In March 2012, Mellow agreed to plead guilty to charges of conspiracy to commit mail fraud and filing a false income tax return. Mellow formally pleaded guilty on May 9, 2012 to a conspiracy charge related to using Senate staff members to do political work and filing a false tax return.

During the proceedings, U.S. District Judge Joel H. Slomsky thoroughly laid out the charges and the plea agreement for the former senator, making sure Mellow understood the plea agreement and the consequences of it. Asked if he understood that he could receive a maximum prison sentence of five years, Mellow replied "I do". He gave the same answer when asked if he understood he was pleading guilty to a felony and that it would affect his ability to vote and hold a political office. He was sentenced to 16 months in federal prison on November 30, 2012. He forfeited his state-funded pension when he was sent to federal prison after his political corruption and tax evasion convictions. However, his pension was later restored in 2017, in a narrow 6-5 decision.

After serving his sentence, in 2014 all other charges were dismissed.

In 2016, Mellow released a book titled "Used, Abused & Forgotten - Bob Mellow: A Targeted Senator" which chronicled his life in politics and his time in federal prison.

Notes and references

External links

 Follow the Money'' - Robert J. Mellow
 2006 2004 2002 2000 1998 campaign contributions

1942 births
20th-century American politicians
21st-century American politicians
Bethel University (Tennessee) alumni
Living people
Pennsylvania politicians convicted of crimes
Democratic Party Pennsylvania state senators
People from Lackawanna County, Pennsylvania
Presidents pro tempore of the Pennsylvania Senate
University of Scranton alumni